Vesparo is a synonym or alternative name for several wine grape varieties including:

Malbec
Merille
Muscadelle
Negrette